From 1923 to 1948, there were seven villages in Mandatory Palestine for which the population was predominantly Shia Muslim (of Metawali creed).  They were Tarbikha, Saliha, Malkiyeh, Nabi Yusha, Qadas, Hunin, and Abil al-Qamh.  These villages were transferred from the French to the British sphere as a result of the border agreement of 1923. All of them were depopulated during the 1948 Arab-Israeli War and their former locations are now in northern Israel.

History
At the end of World War I, the British and French governments held most of the Levant under military occupation, with Britain controlling Palestine apart from the northernmost parts, and France controlling Syria and Lebanon. These were administered under the military Occupied Enemy Territorial Administrations (OETA).  After the 1919 Treaty of Versailles prescribed the division of the region into mandates, it was decided at the San Remo conference of May 1920 that Britain would have the Mandate for Palestine while France would have the Mandate for Syria and Lebanon.

In September 1920, the first French high commissioner General Henri Gouraud, announced the birth of the state of Greater Lebanon. On 23 December, the British and French signed an agreement that broadly defined the boundary between their respective spheres.  The agreement also established the Paulet-Newcombe commission to determine the precise boundary, with wide powers to recommend adjustments. In 1921, before the commission had reported, France conducted a census which covered the seven villages and granted Lebanese citizenship to their residents. None of the villages were listed in the 1922 census of Palestine. However, the commission decided on border adjustments which placed the villages on the Palestinian side of the border, along with more than a dozen other villages.  The new boundary was agreed in a treaty of September 1923.  The citizenship of the residents was not changed to Palestinian until 1926.

The 1931 census counted 4,100 Metawalis in Palestine. Abil al-Qamh was about half Shia and half Greek Christian, while the other six were mostly Shia.

During the 1948 Arab-Israeli War, all of the villages were depopulated.  Their residents mostly fled as refugees to Lebanon, though some remained in Israel as internally displaced persons. Israeli communities partly or completely on the lands of the former villages include Yuval, Shomera, Zar'it, Shtula, Margaliot, Ramot Naftali, Yir'on, Yiftah, and Malkia.

In 1994, the refugees from the seven villages, who had been classified as Palestinian refugees since 1948, were granted Lebanese citizenship. Some factions in the Lebanese government, Hezbollah in particular, have called for the seven villages to be "returned to Lebanon".

See also
 Lebanese nationality law
Paulet–Newcombe Agreement
Shebaa farms
Upper Galilee
Good Fence

References

Geography of Northern District (Israel)
Shia Muslim communities
Israel–Lebanon border
Arab villages depopulated during the 1948 Arab–Israeli War